Sulak is a village in the İdil District of Şırnak Province in Turkey. The village is populated by Kurds of the Harunan tribe and had a population of 1,334 in 2021.

The hamlet of Bahçe is attached to Sulak.

References 

Villages in İdil District
Kurdish settlements in Şırnak Province